Turkey Creek is a rural unincorporated community located in eastern Hillsborough County, Florida, United States. The community is served by the 33527 ZIP Code.

Geography
Palm River is located at 27.977 North, 82.185 West, or approximately three miles west-southwest of Plant City. The elevation of the community is 92 feet above sea level.

Description
Turkey Creek's approximate boundaries include Dover to the west, Sydney Road to the north, Mud Lake Road to the east and State Road 60 to the south.

References

External links
Community of Turkey Creek information page
Turkey Creek page from Hometown Locator

Unincorporated communities in Hillsborough County, Florida
Unincorporated communities in Florida